John Francis Hayes (August 5, 1904 – November 1980) was a Canadian writer. He is known best for ten children's historical novels. Among them, A Land Divided and Rebels Ride at Night won the Governor General's Award for juvenile fiction as the year's best Canadian works of 1951 and 1953. Another, The Dangerous Cove (1957), won the Canada Library Association Book of the Year for Children Award in 1959. For his body of work he was named the second recipient of the Vicky Metcalf Award, in 1964.

Life 

Hayes was educated in Winnipeg, Manitoba. He took courses in advertising and writing and in 1930 entered the publishing business. By the mid-1950s he was Vice-President and General Manager of Southam Press Montreal, and Director of the Southam Company Limited.

In 1954 he was elected secretary of the Canadian Authors' Association.

Published books

Novels

All ten novels are historical fiction originally published by Copp Clark Publishing Company. The first nine were illustrated by Fred J. Finley, the last by J. Merle Smith.
Buckskin Colonist: A Story of the Selkirk Settlers (1947)
Treason at York (1949)
A Land Divided (1951) – Governor General's Award for Juvenile Fiction
Rebels Ride at Night (1953) – Governor General's Award
Bugles in the Hills: A Story of the Mounties' First Days  (1955)
The Dangerous Cove: A Story of the Early Days in Newfoundland (1957)
Quest in the Cariboo (1960)
Flaming Prairie (1965)
The Steel Ribbon (1967)
On Loyalist Trails (1971)

Shorter fiction

Canadian Christmas (1962)
The Atlas Christmas Anthology of Canadian Stories 1963 (1963)
The Atlas Christmas Anthology of Canadian Stories 1964 (1964)
The Atlas Christmas Anthology of Canadian Stories 1965 (1965)
The Atlas Christmas Anthology of Canadian Stories 1966 (1966)
The Atlas Christmas Anthology of Canadian Stories 1968 (1968)
The Atlas Christmas Anthology of Canadian Stories 1969 (1969)

Non-fiction

The Challenge of Change: 50 years, 1912–1962 (1963)
Rosedale United Church: 1914–1964 (1964)
The Mapping of Early Canada (1967)
The Nation Builders (1968)
''Wilderness Mission: The Story of Sainte-Marie-among-the-Hurons (1969)

References

External links

  (mainly under 'Hayes, John F.' without '1904–', previous page of browse report)

Canadian children's writers
Canadian male non-fiction writers
Governor General's Award-winning children's writers
1904 births
1980 deaths
20th-century Canadian historians
Date of death missing
Place of birth missing
Place of death missing